Debreceni VSC is a Hungarian handball club, based in Debrecen, Hungary.

European record
As of 21 November 2020:

EHF-organised seasonal competitions
Debreceni VSC score listed first. As of 11 February 2023.

European Cup and Champions League

European League (IHF and EHF Cup)

City Cup (Challenge Cup)

Cup Winners' Cup
From the 2016–17 season, the women's competition was merged with the EHF Cup.

Champions Trophy

References

External links
 Official website
 Debreceni VSC at eurohandball.com

Hungarian handball clubs in European handball